Bruce Gentry – Daredevil of the Skies (1949) is a 15-episode Columbia Pictures movie serial based on the Bruce Gentry comic strip created by Ray Bailey. It features the first cinematic appearance of a flying saucer, as the secret weapon of the villainous Recorder.

Plot
Dr Benson (Forrest Taylor), a friend of charter pilot Bruce Gentry (Tom Neal), is kidnapped by the mysterious enemy agent, "the Recorder" who only issues orders through recordings. Benson is used to perfect the villain's flying saucers, launched and controlled by electronic means. Industrialist Paul Radcliffe (Hugh Prosser) hires Bruce to investigate the saucers as he thinks they may have a commercial use.

Necessary for the production of the flying saucers is a mineral called Platonite. The Recorder's only source, an abandoned mine on the land belonging to Jaunita (Judy Clark) and Frank Farrell (Ralph Hodges), has run dry and he needs to steal supplies from the US Government.

When Bruce closes in on The Recorder, he finds out that his prey is actually Dr. Benson. Krendon (Tristram Coffin), one of his henchmen, releases a deadly flying saucer on an attack against the Panama Canal. In his aircraft, Bruce intercepts the saucer, crashing into it, and escaping the resultant explosion by taking to his parachute. Back at The Recorder's headquarters, the saucer controls explode, killing all the enemy agents.

Cliffhangers
At the end of chapter 14, Gentry drives over a cliff on a motorbike.  In the resolution at the beginning of chapter 15, Gentry is replaced by an animated sequence which shows him escaping death by use of a parachute hidden under his jacket. The cliffhangers, and their resolutions, in chapters one and 12 are almost identical.

Cast

Production
The flying disc is described by Harmon and Glut as "an embarrassingly bad animated cartoon drawn over the action scenes." Animation also appears in the resolution of a cliffhanger, in which an animated Gentry is used instead of a stuntman.

The flying disc, however, may be the first cinematic appearance of a flying saucer.

Chapter titles
 The Mysterious Disc
 The Mine of Menace
 Fiery Furnace
 Grande Crossing
 Danger Trail
 A Flight for Life
 A Flying Disc
 Fate Takes the Wheel
 Hazardous Heights
 Over the Falls
 Gentry at Bay
 Parachute of Peril
 Menace of the Mesa
 Bruce's Strategy
 The Final Disc
Source:

Critical reception
According to Harmon and Glut, Bruce Gentry was "one of Columbia's closest attempts at imitating the serials of Republic, a studio known for superbly staged action sequences" but it did not equal Republic's standards.

Film historian William Cline describes the serial as a "pretty good airplane adventure."

References

Notes

Bibliography

 Cline, William C. "2. In Search of Ammunition". In the Nick of Time. Jefferson, North Carolina: McFarland & Company, Inc., 1984. .
 Cline, William C. "Filmography". In the Nick of Time. Jefferson, North Carolina: McFarland & Company, Inc., 1984. .
 Greer, John Michael. The UFO Phenomenon: Fact, Fantasy and Disinformation. Woodbury, Minnesota: Llewellyn Publications, 2009. .
 Harmon, Jim and Donald F. Glut. "7. The Aviators "Land That Plane at Once, You Crazy Fool". The Great Movie Serials: Their Sound and Fury. London: Routledge, 1973. .
 Weiss, Ken and Ed Goodgold. To be Continued ...: A Complete Guide to Motion Picture Serials. New York: Bonanza Books, 1973.

External links
 
 Bruce Gentry at Toonopedia

1949 films
1940s English-language films
American aviation films
1940s science fiction adventure films
American science fiction adventure films
American black-and-white films
Columbia Pictures film serials
Films based on American comics
UFO-related films
Films directed by Spencer Gordon Bennet
Films with screenplays by George H. Plympton
Films with screenplays by Joseph F. Poland
1940s American films